Simpang Tiga Redelong is a town in Aceh Special District, in the north of Sumatra, Indonesia. Since 18 December 2003 it has been the seat (capital) of Bener Meriah Regency.

References

Populated places in Aceh
Regency seats of Aceh